Elmer Gantry is a 1927 novel by Sinclair Lewis.

Elmer Gantry may also refer to:

Elmer Gantry (film), a 1960 adaptation of the novel
Elmer Gantry (opera), another adaptation, which premiered in 2007
Gantry (musical), a 1970 Broadway adaptation of the novel Elmer Gantry
Elmer Gantry, stage persona of musician Dave Terry of Elmer Gantry's Velvet Opera and Stretch (band)
Elmer Gantry, played by Buster Keaton in Spite Marriage (1929 film)
Elmer Gantry, name of a race horse in Pride of the Blue Grass (1939 film)